The Ascaso Column was the third column organized in Barcelona at the beginning of the Spanish Civil War.

Further reading 
 Albert Minning. For the good of the revolution. Alikornio editions. Barcelona 2005. 
 Antoine Giménez.  Of Love, War and Revolution.  Pumpkin Nuggets, 2009.
 Vicente Guarner.  Catalonia in the Spanish War  (Ed. G. del Toro)
 Martínez de Sas, María Teresa et al.:  Biographical Dictionary of the Movement to Work in Catalan Countries , Ed. Publicacions de L'Abadia de Montserrat. 
Spanish Revolution of 1936
Defunct anarchist militant groups
Military units and formations of the Spanish Civil War
Confederal militias
Military units and formations established in 1936
Military units and formations disestablished in 1937